Scissel is the scrap produced in the punching of coin blanks from a continuous strip of metal. The scrap is collected and remelted to form new sheets, or may be melted for manufacture of other alloys.

See also
Sissel Norwegian female given name
Sisal fibrous plant

References

Metalworking